From Doon with Death was the debut novel of British writer Ruth Rendell, first published in 1964. The story was later made into a movie in 1988. The novel introduced her popular recurring character Inspector Wexford, who went on to feature in 24 of her novels.

Criticism and context
Although the identity of the victim's lover "Doon" would not be much of a surprise to the 21st century reader, at the time of its release it was considered ground-breaking and daring, and this novel immediately garnered Rendell international critical attention.

References

 

1964 British novels
Novels by Ruth Rendell
Inspector Wexford series
1964 debut novels
John Long Ltd books